Tianderah is a historic home located at Gilbertsville in Otsego County, New York. It was built in 1887 by Boston-based architect William Ralph Emerson.  It is an "L" shaped, stone Romanesque Revival and Shingle style residence dramatically overlooking the village and complemented by a stone and shingle style stable.  The house is three stories and has a steep gambrel roof, a full two stories high.  It is built of rock faced bluestone and features a  verandah that runs across the front of the main facade.  Also on the property is a carriage shed, carriage house, and much of the original landscaping. The estate was placed on the market in July 2007 for $3 million, the highest price ever asked for a private residence in Otsego County.

It was listed on the National Register of Historic Places in 1978.

References

Houses on the National Register of Historic Places in New York (state)
Houses completed in 1887
Shingle Style houses
Houses in Otsego County, New York
National Register of Historic Places in Otsego County, New York
Shingle Style architecture in New York (state)